is a Japanese footballer currently playing as a forward for Gainare Tottori.

Career statistics

Club
.

Notes

References

External links

1997 births
Living people
Association football people from Chiba Prefecture
Tokyo University of Agriculture alumni
Japanese footballers
Association football defenders
J3 League players
JEF United Chiba players
Gainare Tottori players